The men's pole vault event at the 1975 European Athletics Indoor Championships was held on 9 March in Katowice.

Results

References

Pole vault at the European Athletics Indoor Championships
Pole